Orange is the colour between yellow and red on the spectrum of visible light. Human eyes perceive orange when observing light with a dominant wavelength between roughly 585 and 620 nanometres. In traditional colour theory, it is a secondary colour of pigments, produced by mixing yellow and red. In the RGB colour model, it is a tertiary colour. It is named after the fruit of the same name.

The orange colour of many fruits and vegetables, such as carrots, pumpkins, sweet potatoes, and oranges, comes from carotenes, a type of photosynthetic pigment. These pigments convert the light energy that the plants absorb from the Sun into chemical energy for the plants' growth. Similarly, the hues of autumn leaves are from the same pigment after chlorophyll is removed.

In Europe and America, surveys show that orange is the colour most associated with amusement, the unconventional, extroversion, warmth, fire, energy, activity, danger, taste and aroma, the autumn and Allhallowtide seasons, as well as having long been the national colour of the Netherlands and the House of Orange. It also serves as the political colour of the Christian democracy political ideology and most Christian democratic political parties. In Asia, it is an important symbolic colour in Buddhism and Hinduism.

In nature and culture

Etymology
In English, the colour orange is named after the appearance of the ripe orange fruit. The French word, in turn, comes from the Italian , based on Arabic , borrowed from Persian  derived from Sanskrit , which in turn derives from a Dravidian root word (compare / / which refers to bitter orange in Tamil and Malayalam). The earliest known recorded use of orange as a colour name in English was in 1502, in a description of clothing purchased for Margaret Tudor. Another early recorded use was in 1512, in a will now filed with the Public Record Office. The place-name "Orange" has a separate etymology and is not related to that of the colour.

Before this word was introduced to the English-speaking world, saffron already existed in the English language. Alternatively, orange things were sometimes described as red such as red deer, red hair, the Red Planet and robin redbreast.

History and art
In ancient Egypt, and ancient India, artists used an orange colour on some of their items. In Egypt, a mineral pigment called realgar was used for tomb paintings, as well as for other purposes. Orange carnelians were significantly used during Indus Valley civilization which was, in turn, obtained the people from Kutch, Gujarat. The colour was also used later by Medieval artists for the colouring of manuscripts. Pigments were also made in ancient times from a mineral known as orpiment. Orpiment was an important item of trade in the Roman Empire and was used as a medicine in China although it contains arsenic and is highly toxic. It was also used as a fly poison and to poison arrows. Because of its yellow-orange colour, it was also a favourite with alchemists who were searching for a way to make gold, both in China and in the West.

Before the late 15th century, the colour orange existed in Europe, but without the name; it was simply called yellow-red. Portuguese merchants brought the first orange trees to Europe from Asia in the late 15th and early 16th century, along with the Sanskrit , which gradually became part of several European languages:  in Spanish,  in Portuguese, and orange in English.

House of Orange
The House of Orange-Nassau was one of the most influential royal houses in Europe in the 16th and 17th centuries. The Principality of Orange took its name not from the fruit, but from a Roman-Celtic settlement on the site which was founded in 36 or 35 BC and was named Arausio, after a Celtic water god; however, the name may have been slightly altered, and the town associated with the colour, because it was on the route by which quantities of oranges were brought from southern ports such as Marseille to northern France.

The family of the Prince of Orange eventually adopted the name and the colour orange in the 1570s. The colour came to be associated with Protestantism, due to participation by the House of Orange on the Protestant side in the French Wars of Religion. One member of the house, William I of Orange, organised the Dutch resistance against Spain, a war that lasted eighty years, until the Netherlands won its independence. The House's arguably most prominent member, William III of Orange, became King of England in 1689, after the downfall of the Catholic James II in the Glorious Revolution.

Due to William III, orange became an important political colour in Britain and Europe. William was a Protestant, and as such, he defended the Protestant minority of Ireland against the majority Roman Catholic population. As a result, the Protestants of Ireland were known as Orangemen. Orange eventually became one of the colours of the Irish flag, symbolising the Protestant heritage. His rebel flag became the forerunner of The Netherlands' modern flag.

When the Dutch settlers living in the Cape Colony (now part of South Africa) migrated into the Southern African heartlands in the 19th century, they founded what they called the Orange Free State. In the United States, the flag of the City of New York has an orange stripe, to remember the Dutch colonists who founded the city. William of Orange is also remembered as the founder of the College of William & Mary, and Nassau County in New York is named after the House of Orange-Nassau.

18th and 19th century
Oranges themselves became more common in northern Europe, thanks to the 17th-century invention of the heated greenhouse, a building type which became known as an orangerie. The French artist Jean-Honoré Fragonard depicted an allegorical figure of "inspiration" dressed in orange.

In 1797 a French scientist Louis Vauquelin discovered the mineral crocoite, or lead chromate, which led in 1809 to the invention of the synthetic pigment chrome orange. Other synthetic pigments, cobalt red, cobalt yellow, and cobalt orange, the last made from cadmium sulfide plus cadmium selenide, soon followed. These new pigments, plus the invention of the metal paint tube in 1841, made it possible for artists to paint outdoors and to capture the colours of natural light.

In Britain orange became highly popular with the Pre-Raphaelites and with history painters. The flowing red-orange hair of Elizabeth Siddal, a prolific model and the wife of painter Dante Gabriel Rossetti, became a symbol of the Pre-Raphaelite movement. Lord Leighton, the president of the Royal Academy, produced Flaming June, a painting of a sleeping young woman in a bright orange dress, which won wide acclaim. Albert Joseph Moore painted festive scenes of Romans wearing orange cloaks brighter than any the Romans ever likely wore. In the United States, Winslow Homer brightened his palette with vivid oranges.

In France, painters took orange in an entirely different direction. In 1872 Claude Monet painted Impression, Sunrise, a tiny orange sun and some orange light reflected on the clouds and water in the centre of a hazy blue landscape. This painting gave its name to the impressionist movement.

Orange became an important colour for all the impressionist painters. They all had studied the recent books on colour theory, and they know that orange placed next to azure blue made both colours much brighter. Auguste Renoir painted boats with stripes of chrome orange paint straight from the tube. Paul Cézanne did not use orange pigment, but produced his own oranges with touches of yellow, red and ochre against a blue background. Toulouse-Lautrec often used oranges in the skirts of dancers and gowns of Parisiennes in the cafes and clubs he portrayed. For him, it was the colour of festivity and amusement.

The post-impressionists went even further with orange. Paul Gauguin used oranges as backgrounds, for clothing and skin colour, to fill his pictures with light and exoticism. But no other painter used orange so often and dramatically as Vincent van Gogh. who had shared a house with Gauguin in Arles for a time. For Van Gogh orange and yellow were the pure sunlight of Provence. He produced his own oranges with mixtures of yellow, ochre and red, and placed them next to slashes of sienna red and bottle green, and below a sky of turbulent blue and violet. He put an orange moon and stars in a cobalt blue sky. He wrote to his brother Theo of "searching for oppositions of blue with orange, of red with green, of yellow with violet, searching for broken colours and neutral colours to harmonize the brutality of extremes, trying to make the colours intense, and not a harmony of greys."

20th and 21st centuries
In the 20th and 21st centuries, the colour orange had highly varied associations, both positive and negative.

The high visibility of orange made it a popular colour for certain kinds of clothing and equipment. During the Second World War, US Navy pilots in the Pacific began to wear orange inflatable life jackets, which could be spotted by search and rescue planes. After the war, these jackets became common on both civilian and naval vessels of all sizes, and on aircraft flown over water. Orange is also widely worn (to avoid being hit) by workers on highways and by cyclists.

A herbicide called Agent Orange was widely sprayed from aircraft by the Royal Air Force during the Malayan Emergency and the US Air Force during the Vietnam War to remove the forest and jungle cover beneath which enemy combatants were believed to be hiding, and to expose their supply routes. The chemical was not actually orange, but took its name from the colour of the steel drums in which it was stored. Agent Orange was toxic, and was later linked to birth defects and other health problems.

Orange also had and continues to have a political dimension. Orange serves as the colour of Christian democratic political ideology, which is based on Catholic social teaching and Neo-Calvinist theology; Christian democratic political parties came to prominence in Europe and the Americas after World War II.

In Ukraine in November–December 2004, it became the colour of the Orange Revolution, a popular movement which carried activist and reformer Viktor Yushchenko into the presidency. In parts of the world, especially Northern Ireland, the colour is associated with the Orange Order, a Protestant fraternal organisation and relatedly, Orangemen, marches and other social and political activities, with the colour orange being associated with Protestantism similar to the Netherlands.

Science

Optics

In optics, orange is the colour seen by the eye when looking at light with a wavelength between approximately 585–620nm. It has a hue of 30° in HSV colour space.

In the traditional colour wheel used by painters, orange is the range of colours between red and yellow, and painters can obtain orange simply by mixing red and yellow in various proportions; however these colours are never as vivid as a pure orange pigment. In the RGB colour model (the system used to display colours on a television or computer screen), orange is generated by combining high intensity red light with a lower intensity green light, with the blue light turned off entirely. Orange is a tertiary colour which is numerically halfway between gamma-compressed red and yellow, as can be seen in the RGB colour wheel.

Regarding painting, blue is the complementary colour to orange. As many painters of the 19th century discovered, blue and orange reinforce each other. The painter Vincent van Gogh wrote to his brother Theo that in his paintings, he was trying to reveal "the oppositions of blue with orange, of red with green, of yellow with violet... trying to make the colours intense and not a harmony of grey". In another letter he wrote simply, "there is no orange without blue." Van Gogh, Pierre-Auguste Renoir and many other impressionist and post-impressionist painters frequently placed orange against azure or cobalt blue, to make both colours appear brighter.

The actual complement of orange is azure – a colour that is one quarter of the way between blue and green on the colour spectrum. The actual complementary colour of true blue is yellow. Orange pigments are largely in the ochre or cadmium families, and absorb mostly greenish-blue light.

(See also shades of orange).

Pigments and dyes

Other orange pigments include:
Minium and massicot are bright yellow and orange pigments made since ancient times by heating lead oxide and its variants. Minium was used in the Byzantine Empire for making the red-orange colour on illuminated manuscripts, while massicot was used by ancient Egyptian scribes and in the Middle Ages. Both substances are toxic, and were replaced in the beginning of the 20th century by chrome orange and cadmium orange.
Cadmium orange is a synthetic pigment made from cadmium sulfide. It is a by-product of mining for zinc, but also occurs rarely in nature in the mineral greenockite. It is usually made by replacing some of the sulphur with selenium, which results in an expensive but deep and lasting colour. Selenium was discovered in 1817, but the pigment was not made commercially until 1910.
Quinacridone orange is a synthetic organic pigment first identified in 1896 and manufactured in 1935. It makes a vivid and solid orange.
Diketopyrrolopyrrole orange or DPP orange is a synthetic organic pigment first commercialised in 1986. It is sold under various commercial names, such as translucent orange. It makes an extremely bright and lasting orange, and is widely used to colour plastics and fibres, as well as in paints.

Orange natural objects
The orange colour of carrots, pumpkins, sweet potatoes, oranges, and many other fruits and vegetables comes from carotenes, a type of photosynthetic pigment. These pigments convert the light energy that the plants absorb from the sun into chemical energy for the plants' growth. The carotenes themselves take their name from the carrot. Autumn leaves also get their orange colour from carotenes. When the weather turns cold and production of green chlorophyll stops, the orange colour remains.

Before the 18th century, carrots from Asia were usually purple, while those in Europe were either white or red. Dutch farmers bred a variety that was orange; according to some sources, as a tribute to the stadtholder of Holland and Zeeland, William of Orange. The long orange Dutch carrot, first described in 1721, is the ancestor of the orange horn carrot, one of the most common types found in supermarkets today. It takes its name from the town of Hoorn, in the Netherlands.

Flowers
Orange is traditionally associated with the autumn season, with the harvest and autumn leaves. The flowers, like orange fruits and vegetables and autumn leaves, get their colour from the photosynthetic pigments called carotenes.

Animals

Foods
Orange is a very common colour of fruits, vegetables, spices, and other foods in many different cultures. As a result, orange is the colour most often associated in western culture with taste and aroma. Orange foods include peaches, apricots, mangoes, carrots, shrimp, salmon roe, and many other foods. Orange colour is provided by spices such as paprika, saffron and curry powder. In the United States, with Halloween on 31 October, and in North America with Thanksgiving in October (Canada) and November (US) orange is associated with the harvest colour, and also is the colour of the carved pumpkins, or jack-o-lanterns, used to celebrate the holiday.

Food colourings

People associate certain colours with certain flavours, and the colour of food can influence the perceived flavour in anything from candy to wine. Since orange is popularly associated with good flavour, many companies add orange food colouring to improve the appearance of their packaged foods. Orange pigments and dyes, synthetic or natural, are added to many orange sodas and juices, cheeses (particularly cheddar cheese, Gloucester cheese, and American cheese); snack foods, butter and margarine; breakfast cereals, ice cream, yoghurt, jam and candy. It is also often added to children's medicine, and to chicken feed to make the egg yolks more orange.

The United States Government and the European Union certify a small number of synthetic chemical colourings to be used in food. These are usually aromatic hydrocarbons, or azo dyes, made from petroleum. The most common ones are:
Allura red AC, also known as Red 40 and E129.
Sunset Yellow FCF, also known as Yellow 6 and E110.
Tartrazine, also known as Yellow 5 and E102. A dye used in soft drinks such as Mountain Dew, Kool-Aid, chewing gum, popcorn, breakfast cereals, cosmetics, shampoos, eyeshadow, blush, and lipstick.
Orange B is approved by the US Food and Drug Administration, but only for hot dog and sausage casings.
Citrus Red 2 is certified only to colour orange peels.
Because many consumers are worried about possible health consequences of synthetic dyes, some companies are beginning to use natural food colours. Since these food colours are natural, they do not require any certification from the Food and Drug Administration. The most popular natural food colours are:
Annatto, made from the seeds of the achiote tree. Annatto contains carotenoids, the same ingredient that gives carrots and other vegetables their orange colour. Annatto has been used to dye certain cheeses in Britain, particularly Gloucester cheese, since the 16th century. It is now commonly used to colour American cheese, snack foods, breakfast cereal, butter, and margarine. It is used as a body paint by native populations in Central and South America. In India, women often put it, under the name sindoor, on their hairline to indicate that they are married.
Turmeric is a common spice in South Asia, Persia and the Mideast. It contains the pigments called curcuminoids, widely used as a dye for the robes of Buddhist monks. It is also often used in curry powders and to give flavour to mustard. It is now being used more frequently in Europe and the US to give an orange colour to canned beverages, ice cream, yogurt, popcorn and breakfast cereal. The food colour is usually listed as E100.
Paprika oleoresin contains natural carotenoids, and is made from chili peppers. It is used to colour cheese, orange juice, spice mixtures and packaged sauces. It is also fed to chickens to make their egg yolks more orange.

Culture, associations and symbolism

Confucianism
In Confucianism, the religion and philosophy of ancient China, orange was the colour of transformation. In China and India, the colour took its name not from the orange fruit, but from saffron, the finest and most expensive dye in Asia. According to Confucianism, existence was governed by the interaction of the male active principle, the yang, and the female passive principle, the yin. Yellow was the colour of perfection and nobility; red was the colour of happiness and power. Yellow and red were compared to light and fire, spirituality and sensuality, seemingly opposite but really complementary. Out of the interaction between the two came orange, the colour of transformation.

Hinduism and Buddhism
A wide variety of colours, ranging from a slightly orange yellow to a deep orange red, all simply called saffron, are closely associated with Hinduism and Buddhism, and are commonly worn by monks and holy men across Asia.

In Hinduism, the divinity Krishna is commonly portrayed dressed in yellow or yellow orange. Yellow and saffron are also the colours worn by sadhu, or wandering holy men in India.

In Buddhism orange (or more precisely saffron) was the colour of illumination, the highest state of perfection. The saffron colours of robes to be worn by monks were defined by the Buddhist texts. The robe and its colour is a sign of renunciation of the outside world and commitment to the order. The candidate monk, with his master, first appears before the monks of the monastery in his own clothes, with his new robe under his arm and asks to enter the order. He then takes his vows, puts on the robes, and with his begging bowl, goes out to the world. Thereafter, he spends his mornings begging and his afternoons in contemplation and study, either in a forest, garden, or in the monastery.

According to Buddhist scriptures and commentaries, the robe dye is allowed to be obtained from six kinds of substances: roots and tubers, plants, bark, leaves, flowers and fruits. The robes should also be boiled in water a long time to get the correctly sober colour. Saffron and ochre, usually made with dye from the curcuma longa plant or the heartwood of the jackfruit tree, are the most common colours. The so-called forest monks usually wear ochre robes and city monks saffron, though this is not an official rule.

The colour of robes also varies somewhat among the different "vehicles", or schools of Buddhism, and by country, depending on their doctrines and the dyes available. The monks of the strict Vajrayana, or Tantric Buddhism, practised in Tibet, wear the most colourful robes of saffron and red. The monks of Mahayana Buddhism, practised mainly in Japan, China and Korea, wear lighter yellow or saffron, often with white or black. Monks of Theravada Buddhism, practised in Southeast Asia, usually wear ochre or saffron colour. Monks of the forest tradition in Thailand and other parts of Southeast Asia wear robes of a brownish ochre, dyed from the wood of the jackfruit tree.

Colour of amusement
In Europe and America orange and yellow are the colours most associated with amusement, frivolity and entertainment. In this regard, orange is the exact opposite of its complementary colour, blue, the colour of calm and reflection. Mythological paintings traditionally showed Bacchus (known in Greek mythology as Dionysus), the god of wine, ritual madness and ecstasy, dressed in orange. Clowns have long worn orange wigs. Toulouse-Lautrec used a palette of yellow, black and orange in his posters of Paris cafes and theatres, and Henri Matisse used an orange, yellow and red palette in his painting, the Joy of Living.

Colour of visibility and warning
Orange is the colour most easily seen in dim light or against the water, making it, particularly the shade known as safety orange, the colour of choice for life rafts, life jackets or buoys. Highway temporary signs about construction or detours in the United States are orange, because of its visibility and its association with danger.

It is worn by people wanting to be seen, including highway workers and lifeguards. Prisoners are also sometimes dressed in orange clothing to make them easier to see during an escape. Lifeguards on the beaches of Los Angeles County, both real and in television series, wear orange swimsuits to make them stand out. Orange astronaut suits have the highest visibility in space, or against blue sea. An aircraft's two types of "black box", or flight data recorder and cockpit voice recorder, are actually bright orange, so they can be found more easily. In some cars, connectors related to safety systems, such as the airbag, may be coloured orange.

The Golden Gate Bridge at the entrance of San Francisco Bay is painted international orange to make it more visible in the fog. Next to red, it is the colour most popular for extroverts, and as a symbol of activity.

Orange is sometimes used, like red and yellow, as a colour warning of possible danger or calling for caution. A skull against an orange background means a toxic substance or poison.

In the colour system devised by the US Department of Homeland Security to measure the threat of terrorist attack, an orange level is second only to a red level. The US Manual on Uniform Traffic Control Devices specifies orange for use in temporary and construction signage.

Academia
 In the United States and Canada, orange regalia is associated with the field of engineering.
 The Syracuse University, California Institute of Technology, Princeton University, Occidental College, and University of Tennessee use orange as a main colour.

Selected flags

Geography
 Orange is the national colour of the Netherlands. The royal family, the House of Orange-Nassau, derives its name in part from its former holding, the principality of Orange. (The title Prince of Orange is still used for the Dutch heir apparent.)
The Republic of the Orange Free State was an independent Boer republic in southern Africa during the second half of the 19th century, and later a British colony and a province of the Union of South Africa. It is the historical precursor to the present-day Free State province. Extending between the Orange and Vaal river, its borders were determined by the United Kingdom in 1848 when the region was proclaimed as the Orange River Sovereignty, with a seat of a British Resident in Bloemfontein.
Oranjemund (German for 'Mouth of Oranje') is a town situated in the extreme southwest of Namibia, on the northern bank of the Orange River mouth.

Contemporary political and social movements

Because of its symbolic meaning as the orange colour of activity, orange is often used as the colour of political and social movements.
 Christian democratic political ideology and political parties, which are based on Catholic social teaching and Neo-Calvinist theology.
 The Orange Institution a.k.a. the Orange Order is a pro-British Protestant association based in Northern Ireland.
 Orange was the rallying colour of the 2004–2005 Orange Revolution in Ukraine.
 Orange was the colour used by the historical Liberal Party of the United Kingdom 
 On 14 September 2017 North America's United Synagogue of Conservative Judaism began to use orange as part of a regarding effort.
 Orange was used as a rallying colour by Israelis (such as Jewish settlers) who opposed Israel's unilateral disengagement plan in the Gaza Strip and the West Bank in 2005.
 Orange ribbons are used to promote awareness and prevention of self-injury.
 Orange is also used in the ribbon of the Order of St. George in Russia.
 Orange is the party colour of several Christian democratic political parties, as well as others:

 Alliance for the Future of Austria (BZÖ)
 American Solidarity Party (ASP), United States
 Bharatiya Janata Party (BJP), India
 Christian Democrats, Denmark
 Christian Democratic and Flemish (CD&V), Belgium
 Humanist Democratic Centre (CDH), Belgium
 Christian Social Party (CSP), Belgium
 Christian Democratic People's Party, Switzerland
 Christian Democratic Union, Germany
 Christian Social People's Party, Luxembourg
 Citizens-Party of the Citizenry, Spain
 Czech Social Democratic Party
 Democratic Liberal Party, Romania
 Democratic Movement, France
 Free Patriotic Movement, Lebanon
 Party Workers' Liberation Front 30th of May (Frente Obrero), Curaçao
 Fidesz – Hungarian Civic Union
 Independence Party of Minnesota
 Justice and Truth Alliance, Romania
 Nacionalista Party, Philippines
 National Union, Israel
 New Democratic Party, Canada
The NDP's unexpected sweep of seats in Quebec and its consequent rise to official opposition in the 2011 federal election became known as the "Orange Wave" or "Orange Crush".
 Orange Democratic Movement, Kenya
 Orange Movement, Italy
 Our Ukraine–People's Self-Defense Bloc
 Palikot's Movement, Poland
 People's National Party, Jamaica
 People First Party, Republic of China (Taiwan)
 PORA, Ukraine
 Pwersa ng Masang Pilipino, Philippines
 Québec solidaire, Canada
 Reformed Political Party, Netherlands
 Republican Left of Catalonia, Spain
 Shiv Sena, India
 Social Democratic Party, Portugal
 United Nationalist Alliance, Philippines
 Valencian Nationalist Bloc-Coalició Compromís, Spain
 Zares, Slovenia

Religion

 Orange, or more specifically deep saffron, is the most sacred colour of Hinduism.
 Hindu and Sikh flags atop mandirs and gurdwaras, respectively, are typically a saffron-coloured pennant.
 Saffron robes are often worn by Hindu swamis and also by Buddhist monks in the Theravada tradition.
In Paganism, orange represents energy, attraction, vitality, and stimulation. It can help with adapting, encouragement, and power.

Metaphysics and occultism
 The "New Age Prophetess", Alice Bailey, in her system called the Seven Rays which classifies humans into seven different metaphysical psychological types, the "fifth ray" of "Concrete Science" is represented by the colour orange. People who have this metaphysical psychological type are said to be "on the Orange Ray".
 Orange is used to symbolically represent the second (Swadhisthana) chakra.
In alchemy, orpiment – a contraction of the Latin word for gold (aurum) and colour (pigmentum) – was believed to be a key ingredient in the creation of the Philosopher's Stone.

In the military
In the United States Army, orange has traditionally been associated with the dragoons, the mounted infantry units which eventually became the US Cavalry. The 1st Cavalry Regiment was founded in 1833 as the United States Dragoons. The modern coat of arms of the 1st Cavalry features the colour orange and orange-yellow shade called dragoon yellow, the colours of the early US dragoon regiments.
The US Signal Corps, founded at the beginning of the American Civil War, adopted orange and white as its official colours in 1872. Orange was adopted because it was the colour of a signal fire, historically used at night while smoke was used during the day, to communicate with distant army units.

In the Royal Netherlands Air Force, aircraft may have a roundel with an orange dot in the middle, surrounded by three circular sectors in red, white, and blue.

In the Indonesian Air Force, the Air force infantry and special forces corps known as Paskhas uses Orange as their beret colour.

Corporate brands
Several corporate brands use orange, such as Blogger, Fanta, FedEx, GlaxoSmithKline, Gulf, Hankook, Harley-Davidson, ING, Jägermeister, Nickelodeon, Orange, the Women's National Basketball Association, The Home Depot, PornHub and TNT.

Sports

See also
 Amber
 List of colours
 Shades of orange
 Skin-contact wine

Notes

References

External links

 Orange Spectrum Color Chart Listing

Optical spectrum
Rainbow colors
Secondary colors
Tertiary colors